Marcel Martel  (born 1965) is a Canadian historian. He currently holds the Avie Bennett Historica Chair in Canadian History at York University.

A student of Ramsay Cook, Martel has published extensively on topics ranging from French Canadian nationalism to federal drug policy.
In 2017, Martel was elected a Fellow of the Royal Society of Canada.

References 

1965 births
20th-century Canadian historians
Canadian male non-fiction writers
Living people
Fellows of the Royal Society of Canada
Academic staff of York University
Historians of Quebec
21st-century Canadian historians